Kasper Møller Hansen (born 28 June 1973 in Aarhus) is a Danish political scientist and professor with the Department of Political Science at the University of Copenhagen. He specialises in attitude formation, voter behaviour and voter turnout.

References 

1973 births
Living people
Danish political scientists